The MARTA Rail network, a component of the MARTA transit system in Metro Atlanta, has four service lines: the Red, Gold, Blue, and Green Lines. The Red and Gold Lines mainly run along the North-Northeast corridor, and the Blue and Green Lines run along the West-East corridor. The two corridors connect at the Five Points station, which is the only station where all four lines could transfer.

Rail system 

All trains are identified by their destinations, and an automated announcement system announces train destinations, bus and other transit connections, and landmarks that are at or nearby each rail station.

Each station also has a secondary designation that provides the cardinal direction (typically north, south, east, or west) and relative distance from the central Five Points station. For instance, Lindbergh Center is the sixth station from Five Points traveling north, and has the secondary designation (N6). Northeast of Lindbergh Center on the Gold Line, stations are designated with NE while continuing the numbering, so Lenox is (NE7). Similarly, Bankhead is on a branch from the main east-west trunk and is designated (P4), a legacy of the original Proctor Creek name for the Green Line.

During daytime hours, trains on the Red and Gold lines service the entire north-south trunk line and split north of Lindbergh Center (N6). All MARTA trains are identified with a destination on electronic LCD signs on the front and sides of the train and on each car. After 9pm, the Red Line is short-turned and runs as a shuttle between North Springs (N11) and Lindbergh Center (N6), connecting to the Gold Line at Lindbergh Center. The connection is scheduled, with southbound Red trains arriving at Lindbergh Center just before Gold trains continuing southbound, and in reverse, northbound Gold trains arrive at Lindbergh just before Red trains leave northbound.

Blue and Green lines service the east-west trunk line together between Ashby (W3) and Edgewood–Candler Park (E4). At Ashby, Blue Line service continues to H.E. Holmes (W5) while Green Line trains divert to Bankhead Station (P4). Green Line service terminates at Edgewood–Candler Park, while the Blue Line continues east to Indian Creek. After 9pm, Green Line service is short-turned and operates as a shuttle between Bankhead (P4) and Vine City (stop W2). On weekends before 9pm, Green Line service is short-turned at King Memorial (stop E2).

Older system maps used orange to denote the North-South line and blue for the East-West line, including the Northeast and Proctor Creek branches. Lines were identified by the direction of travel and/or terminii. MARTA switched to a color-based route naming system in October 2009, so the North-South or North Springs-Airport line became the Red Line, for example. The former Northeast line that served Doraville, known as the "heart of Atlanta's Asian community", was initially named the Yellow Line, which Asian-Americans found derogatory. It was renamed to the Gold Line in 2010 in response to the complaints.

Many suburban stations offer designated free daily and paid long term parking in MARTA-operated park and ride lots. These stations also have designated kiss and ride passenger drop off parking spaces closest to the stations' entrances.

Operation 
The MARTA rail system operates between approximately 4:45 a.m. and 1 a.m. Monday through Friday, and 6 a.m. to 1 a.m. Saturdays and Sundays.

Due to the COVID-19 pandemic in Atlanta, train headways were reduced to 15 minute intervals between trains during most weekday hours and 20 minutes at other times.

Originally, MARTA operated trains every eight minutes during the day on weekdays on each route. When two routes operated on the same tracks, the effective headway was cut in half, and the North-South Line operated on a combined four-minute headway between Lindbergh Center and Airport stations on the trunk.  On Saturdays, it was every ten minutes (five minutes combined on the North-South Line trunk), and on Sundays it was every 15 minutes (7.5 minutes on the North-South Line trunk).  At night, trains operated every 15 minutes.

After budget cuts in 2005 affected the rail system, headways were increased by 25–50% to 10 minutes weekdays during rush hour and 12 minutes during midday, and 20 minutes nightly and weekends. For combined service, headways decrease to 5 minutes during rush hour and 6 minutes during midday and 10 minutes on the weekends during the day.  All rail lines operate 20 minutes during late night (8:30pm weekdays, 8:50pm weekends) as the Red Line was short-turned and only ran from North Springs to Lindbergh Center; likewise the Green Line was short turned and operated from Bankhead to Vine City. Due to ongoing rail system maintenance, weekend headways were variable and could range from the normal 20 minutes to as much as 24 minutes, with the Green and Red lines occasionally being truncated all weekend. During weekends in the latter case, headways along the shared lines will increase from 10 minutes to 20 minutes.

Stations 

 † denotes a terminal station
 Until 1994, the NE codes were designated as N

Rolling stock 
The trains are powered by an electrified third rail and can be operated in any combination from two to eight rail cars, with six cars being the normal length for the Blue, Red and Gold rail lines, and two cars for the Green line (due to the shorter platform at Bankhead).

In 2002, Alstom was contracted by MARTA to overhaul 98 CQ310 cars and all 120 CQ311 cars as part of a $246m refurbishment contract. The rehabilitated cars feature upgraded passenger amenities and upgraded propulsion and train control hardware. The first rehabilitated cars began service on March 12, 2006. The rehabilitation was completed on February 23, 2009.

In 2011, Alstom was awarded an additional $117 million 5-year contract with MARTA to upgrade its train control and SCADA systems. The new technology is designed to provide MARTA's rail team with more efficient operations, better communication between trains and stations, enhanced monitoring capabilities, quicker response times, and reduced maintenance costs. Included in the project is an upgrade for all 318 rail cars to install an enhanced Fault Identification and Monitoring System (FIMS) and full color driver's display built by Quester Tangent. The new systems passed "mini fleet" testing in 2015.

On December 1, 2017, MARTA posted a notice of intent to award a $146 million contract for the "Rail Car Life Extension Program" to Kinki Sharyo International LLC. On January 26, 2018, Kinki Sharyo signed the $146 million rail car refurbishment contract. The work starts with 118 cars, with 94 more options.

On March 29, 2019, Stadler Rail was awarded the contract to manufacture up to 354 new CQ400 rail cars for MARTA. These cars, which will enter into service in 2023, will replace the entire fleet of CQ310, CQ311, and CQ312 trains and provide expansion to the rail fleet.

Historical timeline 
This is a list of key dates which led to the formation of the MARTA stations along the established rapid rail lines.
 June 30, 1979 – MARTA's first line, the East Line, began operating between Avondale and Five Points Station. It also marked the start of MARTA's combined bus and rail service.
 December 22, 1979 – MARTA's second line, the West Line, began operating between Hightower (H.E. Holmes) and Five Points Station.
 September 1982 – the Peachtree Center and West End stations, along the North Line began service.
 December 1982 – the Arts Center and Midtown stations began service.
 December 1984 – five new stations opened: Lindbergh Center, Lenox,  Brookhaven, Oakland City and Lakewood/Fort McPherson. The South Line was introduced.
 August 1986 – the East Point Station opened, extending the South Line by about two miles. A little more than a year later, the Chamblee Station began service and served as the temporary end of the Northeast Line.
 June 18, 1988 – the Airport Station opens, and becomes the southern terminus of the North-South Line.
 December 12, 1992 – The Bankhead Station/Proctor Creek Line went into service.
 December 29, 1992 – The Doraville Station opens and becomes the northern terminus of the Northeast Line.
 June 26, 1993 – MARTA extended East Line services through Kensington to Indian Creek Station – the first time the rail line went beyond the I-285 perimeter.
 June 8, 1996 – MARTA extended North Line services through Buckhead, Medical Center and Dunwoody Stations.
 1999 – MARTA announced a partnership with BellSouth to create the Lindbergh Transit Oriented Development (TOD), a live, work and play community built around a rail station and the largest multi-use development of its kind in the United States at the time.
 December 16, 2000 – MARTA opened two new rail stations – Sandy Springs and North Springs – on the North Line.
 October 1, 2009 – MARTA renames its lines based on colors instead of directions.
 February 2010 – MARTA agrees to rename the Yellow Line as the Gold Line in response to outcry from members of the Doraville Asian community.

Gallery

See also 

 Metropolitan Atlanta Rapid Transit Authority

Notes

References 

Lists of metro stations
Lists of railway stations in the United States
Metropolitan Atlanta Rapid Transit Authority